Ignaz Schiffermüller (born 2 October 1727 in Hellmonsödt; died 21 June 1806 in Linz) was an Austrian naturalist mainly interested in Lepidoptera.

Schiffermüller was a teacher at the Theresianum College in Vienna. His collection was presented to the old United Royal and Imperial Natural History Collections (Vereinigtes k.k. Naturalien-Cabinet) at the Hofburg where it burnt during the revolution in 1848. With Michael Denis, also a teacher at the Theresianum, he published the first index of the Lepidoptera of the Viennese region das Systematische Verzeichnis der Schmetterlinge der Wienergegend herausgegeben von einigen Lehrern am k. k. Theresianum (1775). His collection is in the Kaiserlichen Hof-Naturalienkabinett (now Naturhistorisches Museum Wien). Schiffermüller is also noteworthy for his work in developing a scientifically based colour nomenclature.

In his Versuch eines Farbensystems (1772), Schiffermüller addressed the need for a standardised nomenclature with which to describe the countless colours of nature. Work by predecessors in this field had proved unsatisfactory: he mentions suggestions made by Giovanni Antonio Scopoli (1723–1778) in his Entomologia Carniolica (1763) and August Johann Rösel (1705–1759) in his Insecten-Belustigung (1746–61). To serve as a model, Schiffermüller himself presents a table classifying and sub-classifying shades of blue, and naming them in German, Latin and French: in all, 81 German terms are listed. Matching this table, and using the same alphabetical notation, is a 3 x 12 matrix showing a set of colour samples for blue, with some discussion of the pigments used. The work also contains an attractive full-page engraving with a colour circle, inspired by the optical theory of Father Louis Bertrand Castel (1688–1757) and hand-tinted with twelve colours continuously shading into one another. Evident throughout this pioneering work is a subtle response to the nuances of colour and their accurate rendition.

Works
 Versuch eines Farbensystems, Vienna 1772

References

External links
 "Schiffermüller's Color System," Sarah Lowengard, The Creation of Color in Eighteenth-Century Europe Gutenberg-e series, (New York: Columbia University Press, 2006) http://www.gutenberg-e.org/lowengard/C_Chap57.html
 Groll, E. K. (Hrsg.): Biografien der Entomologen der Welt : Datenbank. Version 4.15 : Senckenberg Deutsches Entomologisches Institut, 2010 

1727 births
1806 deaths
Austrian lepidopterists